Zotzenheim is an Ortsgemeinde – a municipality belonging to a Verbandsgemeinde, a kind of collective municipality – in the Mainz-Bingen district in Rhineland-Palatinate, Germany.

Geography

The municipality lies in Rhenish Hesse. It belongs to the Verbandsgemeinde of Sprendlingen-Gensingen, whose seat is in Sprendlingen.

Culture and sightseeing

Sport
On Kreuznacher Straße is found a cinder team handball court and a clubhouse. HSG Zotzenheim/St. Johann/Sprendlingen is a successful team handball club that grew out of TV Zotzenheim 1901 (gymnastic club) and has already played several times in the third handball league.

Regular events
On 1 May near the Napoleonshöhe mountain, or Gipfel des Horns, or in the local speech also “Hörnchen” (“Little Horn”), the so-called Fire Brigade Festival (Feuerwehrfest) takes place.
In May on the weekend at Ascension Day, a folk festival for the region and beyond is held. In 2006, among others, the bands Paddy Goes To Holyhead, Dhalia's Lane, Galahad and WirrWarr appeared.
On the second weekend in July, a fair is held in Zotzenheim with a wine tent, a few stands and a handball tournament.
Zotzenheim is especially well known for the ZDF (Zotzenheimer Dorf-Fassenacht – the Carnival). Each year there are four “sessions” at the village community centre.

Economy and infrastructure

Wineries
Zotzenheim is home to five major wineries:
 Weingut Werner Pitthan
 Weingut Philipp Schnell
 Weingut Siebenhof
 Weingut Scheffer
 Weingut Saulheimer
There are also several smaller wineries and those who do it as a hobby.

Other businesses
In the industrial park outside Zotzenheim on the street Am neuen Graben, several small businesses have set up shop, among them the Sand Barth shipping company.

References

External links

Municipality’s official webpage 
Verbandsgemeinde of Sprendlingen-Gensingen 

Mainz-Bingen